Columbian School may refer to the following schools in the United States:

(by state)
 Columbian School (Louisville, Kentucky), listed on the NRHP in Kentucky
 Columbian School (Omaha, Nebraska), listed on the NRHP in Nebraska
 Columbian School (Raton, New Mexico), listed on the NRHP in New Mexico